Engineer School may refer to:

 A school for engineering education
 Engineer Officer Basic Course, a US Army education program
 Grandes écoles, a form of University in France